Sir Robert Sibbald (15 April 1641 – August 1722) was a Scottish physician and antiquary.

Life
He was born in Edinburgh, the son of David Sibbald (brother of Sir James Sibbald) and Margaret Boyd (January 1606 – 10 July 1672). Educated at the Royal High School and the Universities of Edinburgh, Leiden, and Paris, he took his doctor's degree at the University of Angers in 1662, and soon afterwards settled as a physician working in Edinburgh.  He resided at "Kipps Castle" near Linlithgow. In 1667 with Sir Andrew Balfour he started the botanical garden in Edinburgh, and he took a leading part in establishing the Royal College of Physicians of Edinburgh, of which he was elected president in 1684. Both Sibbald and Balfour were proponents of the Edinburgh Pharmacopoeia. 

In 1682, Sibbald began assembling material for a projected two volume geographical description or atlas of Scotland, recruiting parish ministers and members of the nobility and gentry to assist him in the task. While the work was never published, many of the manuscripts describing aspects of the geography, natural history and antiquities of parts of Scotland have survived.

In 1685 he was appointed the first professor of medicine at the University of Edinburgh. He was knighted, named Physician to the King, and appointed Geographer Royal in 1682.  

His numerous and miscellaneous writings deal with historical and antiquarian as well as with botanical and medical subjects. 
He based many of his cartographical studies on the work of Timothy Pont. 

He is buried in Greyfriars Kirkyard in Edinburgh in a vault against the southern wall.

The wild flower of Sibbaldia procumbens  is named after him. As well as 2 genera from the family Rosaceae; in 1753, Carl Linnaeus published Sibbaldia, which is a genus of about 13 species of flowering plants. Then in 1941, Juz. published Sibbaldianthe, which has about 7 species of plants.

Taxonomy of the blue whale—Sibbaldus
Sibbald is also remembered for his study of whales.  Originally the blue whale was named after Sibbald, who first described it scientifically.

Although the blue whale is today usually classified as one of eight species in the genus Balaenoptera, one authority still places it in a separate monotypic genus, Sibbaldus, but this is not widely accepted.

The blue whale was once commonly referred to as Sibbald's rorqual.

Works

Sibbald's historical and antiquarian works include:
1683: An Account of the Scottish Atlas. Folio, Edinburgh
1684: Scotia illustrata. Edinburgh
1699: Memoria Balfouriana; sive, Historia rerum, pro literis promovendis, gestarum a ... fratribus Balfouriis ... Jacobo ... et ... Andrea. Authore R.S.. Edinburgi: Typis Hæredum Andreæ Anderson
1699: Provision for the poor in time of dearth and scarcity
1710: A History Ancient and Modern of the Sheriffdoms of Fife and Kinross. Edinburgh
1711: Description of the Isles of Orkney and Shetland. Folio, Edinburgh
1803: A History Ancient and Modern of the Sheriffdoms of Fife and Kinross. Cupar
1837: The Remains of Sir Robert Sibbald, containing his autobiography, memoirs of the Royal College of Physicians, a portion of his literary correspondence, and an account of his MSS.; [edited by James Maidment], 2 pt. in 1 vol. Edinburgh: [printed for the editor]; edition of thirty-five copies; the titlepage of the Autobiography bears the date 1833
1845: Description of the Isles of Orkney and Shetland (folio, Edinburgh)

References

Attribution

External links
Article at National Library of Scotland

1641 births
1722 deaths
University of Angers (pre-1793) alumni
Scientists from Edinburgh
People educated at the Royal High School, Edinburgh
17th-century Scottish medical doctors
18th-century Scottish medical doctors
Scottish geographers
Alumni of the University of Edinburgh
University of Paris alumni
Scottish antiquarians
Leiden University alumni
Scottish botanists
Scottish zoologists
Academics of the University of Edinburgh
18th-century Scottish people
Scottish marine biologists
Marine zoologists
Scottish knights
Medical doctors from Edinburgh
Presidents of the Royal College of Physicians of Edinburgh
Royal Botanic Garden Edinburgh
Writers from Edinburgh